BurroCross is self-reliant (unsupported) backcountry travel on foot (hiking or backpacking) in the company of a burro (Equus africanus asinus) where, similar to Overlanding the experience of the journey itself is the principle objective. (Unlike Overlanding, BurroCross is non-mechanized travel that relies on the capabilities of a burro companion and thereby presents an entirely new skill focus required for the journey.) BurroCross is a non-competitive sport or recreational activity that proceeds at a walking pace and is centered on utilizing the overland capabilities of burros for companionship and sharing the burden of carrying the gear necessary to sustain the journey. The burro and the person progress through the journey and the experience as a team, side-by-side, therefore the burro is not ridden. The term "BurroCross" is a unique play on words that combines "burro" with the notion of cross-country travel, and it is also a nod to the familiar cross-shaped marking down the back and across the shoulders of most burros.

BurroCross can be done as a solo activity (one person, one burro) or as a group of person / burro pairs. Multiple burros may be used in a string, but usually no more than 2 per person is necessary or desirable. A BurroCross outing can take the form of a day hike, but generally multi-day excursions are preferable with BurroCross thru-hiking or section-hiking regarded as the pinnacle achievement of the sport.

Burros 
BurroCross must be carried out with a burro (donkey). If any other animal is used (including a horse or mule), it is not BurroCross. The burro may be of any size (mini, standard, or mammoth) but generally the standard size is preferred due to its ability to carry the necessary weight as well as its comparatively low maintenance needs on the trail. Burros can be of domestic or formerly wild origin (referred to as BLM Burros in the United States).

Gear 
Because the journey is to be enjoyed by both burro and person alike in BurroCross, sharing the burden is also a key component of the sport; which differentiates it from packing, trekking, or the historic use of burros as beasts of burden. The person will normally carry their own personal items in a backpack (clothing, electronics, etc.) and the burro will normally carry the general camp items (tent, sleeping bag, food, etc.), extra water, and its own provisions and gear. Crossing country on foot with a pack burro in tow is not a new endeavor per se, as burros have been relied upon for centuries to carry supplies and lighten the load of workers and travelers alike, but it is a fairly new undertaking in the recreational sense, where nowadays burros are just as valued for their affable companionship as they are for their load-bearing capacity and sure-footed capability over rough terrain. BurroCross is enhanced by the technological advancements that have incorporated the use of durable and ultralight materials into backpacking gear and promotes the same application of technology to pack gear. With BurroCross, gone are the days of canvas tents and Dutch ovens in favor of ultra-high-molecular-weight polyethylene composite fabrics and 3-oz fuel-efficient stoves. A key ethic of BurroCross is the burro as a companion rather than as a worker, therefore the gear selection and how it is shared between the person and the burro is a key consideration. There are many online and published resources for light and ultralight backpacking gear that can be referenced to outfit a BurroCross adventure.

The BurroCross Ethic 
BurroCross embraces the following key ethics, each held as equally important to the other:

 Leave No Trace. Leave No Trace principles are not only promoted with BurroCross, but they are mandatory. BurroCrossers believe that we all have a role in protecting the outdoors for future generations by enjoying it responsibly. BurroCross incorporates and promotes the outdoor ethics principles created by the Leave No Trace Center for Outdoor Ethics. 
 Humane Treatment of Animals. In BurroCross, our burros are regarded as companion animals and partners in recreation and sport. Without them we would not have a sport, therefore every aspect of our involvement with our burros—from husbandry and care to training and use—must be burro-centric and carried out in an educated, responsible, and ethical manner.
 Share the Trail. Enjoyment of multi-use trails requires that everyone practice Share the Trail etiquette.
 Slow is Fast. BurroCross is a non-competitive recreational activity meant to provide an opportunity to enjoy the companionship of a burro on the trail, and to savor the experiences along the way. Whether preparing our burro or actively engaged in BurroCross, we must often accept that we are operating on "Burro Time" where "Slow is Fast." We as human beings have a lot to learn from our burros and embracing the ethic of "slow is fast" (i.e., patience) is key. Operating on "Burro Time" ensures that we savor the journey, which is the purpose and destination itself.

Key Figures 
Several key figures influenced the development of BurroCross as a sport and recreational activity:

 Graham Mackintosh. In the winter of 1997-98 Mackintosh made his way 1,000 miles along The Trail of the Padres from Tecate to Loreto, Mexico with his endearing burro Misión. His journey was a celebration of "the dramatic beauty of Baja, the importance of wilderness, the depth of the relationship between the author and his burro companion." The journey is chronicled in his book, Journey with a Baja Burro.
 Dave Daney. Daney has hiked and backpacked with burros for over 25 years throughout Colorado and surrounding states. Daney wrote his book, Packing with Burros for the express purpose of promoting the use of burros to make wild places more accessible. 
 Michael Younghusband. In 2010, Younghusband walked for six months over 1,500 miles with his burro, Don-Kay and a tag-along dog, Solo from Tecate to Cabo San Lucas, Mexico. He describes his journey in his book Tres Amigos Blancos
 Wylde Williams. With a keen interest in the history of the heritage Burro of the American West (BLM Burro) and promoting the reprise of their long-forgotten role as a valued trail companion (but this time for recreational purposes), Williams coined the term BurroCross and continues working to develop and to promote the sport (BurroCross described on Horses in the Morning).

References 

Ecotourism
Backpacking
Hiking
Donkeys
Adventure travel